James Harry Colliflower (March 11, 1869 – August 12, 1961), nicknamed "Collie", was a Major League Baseball player during the  season. As a 30-year-old rookie southpaw pitcher for the Cleveland Spiders, Colliflower won his debut game on July 21 giving up only 3 runs on 6 hits in a 5–3 victory against his hometown Washington Senators in the first half of a double header. Colliflower then lost his next 11 decisions, compiling an 8.17 earned run average, and a .303 batting average as a substitute outfielder.

In 1905, he coached Georgetown University's baseball team before becoming a minor league umpire for a couple of seasons. He umpired in the American League during the 1910 season. Colliflower umpired in the Southern League in 1911, and the Departmental League in Washington D.C. in 1912. After retiring from umpiring Colliflower worked as a clerk for his nephew's fuel and oil company.

Family
Colliflower's nephew, James E. Colliflower, earned a bachelor's degree and three law degrees from Georgetown. He is enshrined in the Georgetown Athletics Hall of Fame as a coach of the varsity men's basketball squad from 1911 to 1914 and 1921–1922. James' brother George was also a college basketball coach, for George Washington University.

References

External links

Harry Colliflower and the 1899 Cleveland Spiders

1869 births
1961 deaths
19th-century baseball players
Austin Senators players
Baseball players from Maryland
Cleveland Spiders players
Derby Angels players
Georgetown Hoyas men's basketball coaches
Major League Baseball pitchers
New Haven Blues players
New Haven Texas Steers players
Norfolk Clam Eaters players
Norfolk Clams players
Norfolk Crows players
Oswego Grays players
Wilkes-Barre Coal Barons players